Anopsolobus is a monotypic genus of Polynesian araneomorph spiders in the family Orsolobidae containing the single species, Anopsolobus subterraneus. It was first described by Raymond Robert Forster & Norman I. Platnick in 1985, and is only known from Nelson in New Zealand.

Etymology 
"Anopsolobus" refers to the absence of eyes and "subterraneus" refers to the habitat this species was found in.

Taxonomy 
Anopsolobus subterraneus was described in 1985 by Raymond Forster and Normal Platnick from one female specimen. The specimen was found 4 meters underground in a bore using a trap intended to collect interstitial aquatic animals, but instead caught terrestrial animals when the water table receded.

Anopsolobus is suggested to be closely related to the genus Tangata.

Description 
The only specimen is 1.96mm in length, is unpigmented and notably has no eyes. The body is densely covered in hairs.

See also
 List of Orsolobidae species

References

Monotypic Araneomorphae genera
Orsolobidae
Spiders of New Zealand
Taxa named by Raymond Robert Forster
Endemic spiders of New Zealand